Charley Boy (March 4, 1955 – 1968) was a Thoroughbred race horse who achieved great popularity in New England during the 1960s.

Background
Charlie Boy was a brown gelding bred in Kentucky by Penn Bros. During his racing career he was (primarily) owned and trained by William W. Carroll.

Racing career
While racing in the winter of 1959–60, Charlie Boy won the Black Gold Handicap, Christmas Handicap and Pelleteri Handicap at the Fair Grounds in New Orleans to be deemed the best sprinter on the grounds. His four year old season saw him win 13 times in 29 starts for earnings of $46,600.

His biggest win in New England was the 1961 John Alden Handicap at Suffolk Downs which he won by a length in 1:10 1/5 with jockey Phil Grimm up.

Charlie Boy won 58 times on the race track, one of the highest totals in racing history, many of them coming at Narragansett Park. On July 24, 1958, Charlie Boy won at "Gansett" and paid $34.80 on a $2 dollar win ticket.

Death and honors
On February 6, 1968, after suffering a catastrophic injury in training, the fan favorite was put down. The next day, Charlie Boy was buried in the Narragansett Park infield. There was a ceremony which included the playing of "Taps".

References

 Charlie Boy's pedigree and partial racing stats

1955 racehorse births
1968 racehorse deaths
Racehorses bred in Kentucky
Racehorses trained in the United States
Thoroughbred family 12-b